is a 2011 Japanese film directed by Setsurō Wakamatsu, based on the novel of the same name by Keigo Higashino.

Cast
 Gorō Kishitani
 Kyoko Fukada
 Tae Kimura
 Ken Ishiguro
 Masaya Kikawada
 Ken Tanaka
 Hisako Manda
 Masatoshi Nakamura

References

External links
  

Films based on Japanese novels
Films based on works by Keigo Higashino
Films directed by Setsurō Wakamatsu
2010s Japanese films